The early fifteenth century Great Barford Bridge, sometimes called simply Barford Bridge, spans the River Great Ouse at Great Barford, Bedfordshire. It is an arch bridge with seventeen arches, originally built from limestone and sandstone. The bridge underwent significant changes in the 19th century, with a widening project in 1818 that used wood being superseded in 1874 with the use of brick. It is Grade I listed and a Scheduled Ancient Monument.

There is also a Barford Bridge which carries the River Ise over the A43 road between Rushton and Geddington in Northamptonshire.

External links
 Local school information on the bridge
 Navigation of the Great Ouse
 Information on the Ouse Valley Way around Bedford

Bridges across the River Great Ouse
Bridges in Bedfordshire
Deck arch bridges
Bridges completed in the 15th century
Grade I listed bridges
Grade I listed buildings in Bedfordshire
Scheduled monuments in Bedfordshire